Séféto  Ouest is a rural commune in the Cercle of Kita in the Kayes Region of south-western Mali. The commune contains the main town (chef-lieu) of Séféto and 8 villages. In the 2009 census the commune had a population of 19,418.

References

External links
.

Communes of Kayes Region